Shasthri Nagar is a residential neighbourhood in south Chennai, Tamil Nadu, India.

Shasthri Nagar was developed by Tamil Nadu Housing Board (TNHB) in the late 1960s and early 1970s.

The suburb is close to Edward Elliot's Beach of Besant Nagar.

Neighbourhoods in Chennai
Memorials to Lal Bahadur Shastri